Theodore Souris (August 25, 1925 – June 21, 2002) was an American jurist and lawyer.

Born in Detroit, Michigan, Souris served in the United States Army Air Forces during World War II. In 1947, Souris received his bachelor's degree from University of Michigan and in 1949, he received his law degree from University of Michigan Law School. He then practiced law in Detroit, Michigan. He served as general counsel, in 1950 and 1951 for Philip A. Hart when Hart was district director for the United States Office of Price Stabilization. In 1959, Souris was appointed Wayne County, Michigan Circuit Court judge. Souris then served on the Michigan Supreme Court from 1960 until 1969. He then resumed practicing law until 1990 when he retired and moved to Chicago, Illinois with his wife. Souris died of leukemia in Chicago, Illinois.

References

1925 births
2002 deaths
Lawyers from Chicago
Lawyers from Detroit
United States Army Air Forces soldiers
University of Michigan Law School alumni
Michigan state court judges
Justices of the Michigan Supreme Court
20th-century American judges
20th-century American lawyers